Philip Heseltine may refer to:

Peter Warlock, pseudonym of Philip Arnold Heseltine (1894–1930), Anglo-Welsh composer and music critic
Phillip Heseltine (cricketer) (born 1960), former English cricketer